Guildford power station supplied electricity to the town of Guildford and the surrounding area from 1896 to 1967. The power station was built and operated by the Guildford Electricity Supply Company Limited. In 1921 it was acquired by the Guildford Corporation which operated it until the nationalisation of the British electricity supply industry in 1948.

History 
The Holloway Electricity Supply Company Limited was registered on 30 June 1892, it changed its name to the Guildford Electricity Supply Company Limited on 17 September 1894. The company applied for a Provisional Order under the Electric Lighting Acts  to generate and supply electricity to the town of Guildford. An Order was granted by the Board of Trade and was confirmed by Parliament through the Electric Lighting Orders Confirmation (No. 4) Act 1894 (57 & 58 Vict. c. cxv).

The power station was built adjacent to the River Wey and was commissioned in November 1896. The electricity plant comprised Willans engines coupled directly to Goolden dynamos. The Company charged 7d. and 4d./kWh with discounts and sold 15,291 kWh in 1898.

In 1913 the Guildford Electricity Supply Company built a new power house near New Bridge.

In 1921 the Guildford Electricity Supply Company was acquired by the Guildford Corporation. In 1928 the Corporation built a new power station in Woodbridge Road (51°14'45.5"N 0°34'41.6"W) adjacent to the River Wey and the railway with an initial capacity of 6 MW, but which was capable of expansion to 42 MW. The initial stage of construction cost £140,000.

The Central Electricity Board built the first stages of the National Grid between 1927 and 1933. Guildford power station were connected to the electricity grid.

The British electricity supply industry was nationalised in 1948 under the provisions of the Electricity Act 1947 (10 & 11 Geo. 6 c. 54). The Guildford electricity undertaking was abolished, ownership of Guildford power station were vested in the British Electricity Authority, and subsequently the Central Electricity Authority and the Central Electricity Generating Board (CEGB). At the same time the electricity distribution and sales responsibilities of the Guildford electricity undertaking were transferred to the South Eastern Electricity Board (SEEBOARD).

Following nationalisation Guildford power station became part of the Guildford electricity supply district.

Guilford power station was closed in 1967.

Equipment specification

Plant in 1923 
By 1923 the plant at Guildford comprised boilers delivering a total of 25,000 lb/h (3.15 kg/s) of steam to:

 1 × 60 kW reciprocating engine generating direct current (DC)
 1 × 100 kW reciprocating engine generating DC
 2 × 220 kW reciprocating engines generating DC
 1 × 300 kW reciprocating engine generating DC

There was also a 160 kW oil-fired engine generating DC

The total generating capacity was 1,060 kW.

The following electricity supplies were available to consumers:

 440 & 220 Volts DC
 220 Volts 1-phase 50 Hz Alternating Current.

Plant in 1954 
By 1954 the plant (originally installed in 1927–30) comprised:

 Boilers:
 3 × Stirling tri-drum boilers each of 50,000 lb/h (6.3 kg/s) capacity

Total evaporative capacity 150,000 lb/h (18.9 kg/s), steam conditions were 295 psi and 750 °F (20.3 bar and 400 °C), steam was supplied to:

 Generators:
 2 × 1.875 MW Parsons turbo-alternators, 3-phase, 50 Hz, 6,600 volts
 2 × 3.75 MW Parsons turbo-alternator, 3-phase, 50 Hz, 6,600 volts

The total installed generating capacity was 11.25 MW.

Condenser water was abstracted from the river.

Operations

Operating data 1921–23 
The electricity supply data for the period 1921–23 was:

Electricity Loads on the system were:

Revenue from the sale of current (in 1923) was £34,930; the surplus of revenue over expenses was £22,180.

Operating data 1946 
In 1946 Guildford power station supplied 13,277 MWh of electricity; the maximum output load was 11,540 kW.

Operating data 1954–66 
Operating data for the period 1954–6 was:

Guildford Electricity District 
Following nationalisation in 1948 Guildford power station became part of the Guildford electricity supply district, covering 95 square miles (246 km2) with a population of 82,330 in 1958. The number of consumers and electricity sold in the Guildford district was:

In 1958 the number of units sold to categories of consumers was:

Redevelopment 
The 1913 power station building was converted in 1997 to an arts venue called The Electric Theatre.  

The power station in Woodbridge Road was demolished, the site is now occupied by a 132 kV electricity sub-station.

See also 

 Timeline of the UK electricity supply industry
 List of power stations in England

References 

Demolished power stations in the United Kingdom
Coal-fired power stations in England
Former power stations in England
Adaptive reuse of industrial structures in the United Kingdom
Buildings and structures in Guildford